Nikita Sergeyevich Bezlikhotnov (born 19 August 1990) is a Russian former professional football player.

Club career
He made his Russian Premier League debut for FC Kuban Krasnodar on 10 March 2014 in a game against FC Rostov.

On 9 September 2020, Bezlikhotnov signed for FC Kyzylzhar.

References

External links
 
 

1990 births
Living people
Footballers from Moscow
Russian footballers
Russia youth international footballers
Russia under-21 international footballers
Russia national football B team footballers
Association football midfielders
FC Torpedo Moscow players
FC Metalurh Donetsk players
FC Kuban Krasnodar players
FC Ufa players
FC Baltika Kaliningrad players
FC SKA-Khabarovsk players
FC Sibir Novosibirsk players
FC Shinnik Yaroslavl players
FC Armavir players
FC Kyzylzhar players
Russian Premier League players
Ukrainian Premier League players
Kazakhstan Premier League players
Russian expatriate footballers
Expatriate footballers in Ukraine
Expatriate footballers in Kazakhstan